This is the discography of English rock band the Troggs.

Albums

Studio albums

Live albums

Compilation albums

Video albums

EPs

Singles

Notes

References

Discographies of British artists
Rock music group discographies